The 2013 Cotabato City car bombing occurred on August 5, 2013. At least 8 people were killed and 40 others injured after a car bomb exploded in Cotabato City, Maguindanao province in the Philippines. It is the worst such attack ever in Cotabato City.

The police released photos of suspects the day after the bombing.

It was initially suspected that the attack may have targeted Cynthia Guiani-Sayadi, city administrator, who had been receiving death threats, however, she was not harmed.

Additional bombs were found later that week, which were believed to be connected to the incident. They were deactivated before they could cause damage.

References

Terrorist incidents in the Philippines in 2013
Car and truck bombings in Asia
Mass murder in 2013
Cotabato City
History of Maguindanao del Norte
2013 murders in the Philippines
August 2013 crimes in Asia